Viktor Krasko (born 1953) is a retired Soviet backstroke swimmer who won a bronze medal in the 4×100 m medley relay at the 1970 European Aquatics Championships.

References

1953 births
Living people
Russian male swimmers
Male backstroke swimmers
Soviet male swimmers
European Aquatics Championships medalists in swimming